The 2022–23 season is the 114th in the history of SK Sturm Graz and their 57th consecutive season in the top flight. The club will participate in Austrian Football Bundesliga, the Austrian Cup, the UEFA Champions League, and the UEFA Europa League.

Players

First-team squad

Out on loan

Transfers

Pre-season and friendlies

Competitions

Overall record

Austrian Football Bundesliga

League table

Results summary

Results by round

Matches 
The league fixtures were announced on 22 June 2022.

Austrian Cup

UEFA Champions League

Third qualifying round 
The draw for the third qualifying round was held on 18 July 2022.

UEFA Europa League

Group stage 

The draw for the group stage was held on 26 August 2022.

References 

SK Sturm Graz seasons
Sturm Graz